Vladimír Kražel (born 28 September 1991) is a Slovak football defender who at the moment plays for Slavoj Trebišov.

Career
He made his debut for Košice against Senica on 14 August 2010.

External links
 
MFK Košice profile

References

1991 births
Living people
Slovak footballers
Association football defenders
FC VSS Košice players
Slovak Super Liga players
SV Seekirchen players
FK Bodva Moldava nad Bodvou players
FK Slavoj Trebišov players